Adedoyin Olayiwola "Ade" Adepitan  (born 27 March 1973) is a Nigerian-born British television presenter and wheelchair basketball player. As a presenter, he has hosted a range of travel documentaries and sports programmes for BBC television. Adepitan is a disability advocate and one of the first physically disabled television presenters in the UK, with a career that spans 21 years.

Adepitan was born in Lagos. As an infant, he contracted polio, resulting in damage to his legs that left him a wheelchair user. At the age of three, he moved with his family to the United Kingdom, where he grew up in East London. Becoming a wheelchair basketball player, he was part of the British team that played at the 2004 Summer Paralympics, securing a bronze medal. Involved in a range of charities promoting access to sport for disabled people, in 2005 was made a Member of the Order of the British Empire (MBE) for services to disability sport.

During the 2000s, Adepitan began appearing on British television. His early appearances included as an actor in the shows Casualty and Desperados. He also moved into presenting, initially primarily for sports programmes during the 2000s. From the 2010s, he increasingly appeared on travel documentaries, initially for episodes of the Channel 4 series Unreported World and then for the BBC series Africa with Ade Adepitan (2019) and Climate Change: Ade on the Frontline (2021).

In 2021, he was chosen to present open-access meetings of an unaffiliated scientific group set up to report to the public on the changing state of the global environment, following in the footsteps of Independent SAGE.

Early life 
Adepitan was born in the Maryland district in Lagos, Nigeria. At the age of fifteen months, Adepitan contracted polio which resulted in the loss of function of his legs, and ultimately prevented him from walking.

At the age of three, Adepitan and his mother migrated to the United Kingdom to join his father; who lived in the London Borough of Newham. He was educated at Southern Road Primary School in Plaistow which he credits with helping him with his disability and problems at home. From an early age, he had aspirations of becoming an international sportsman. He also attended Lister Community School.

Basketball career 
Adepitan is an accomplished wheelchair basketball player, for his club Milton Keynes Aces and as a member of Great Britain team that won the bronze medal at the 2004 Summer Paralympics in Athens and the gold medal at the 2005 Paralympic World Cup in Manchester.

Television and media career 
Adepitan has featured on many television programmes and series as an actor, presenter or guest, particularly for the BBC. He often uses television as a platform to campaign against racism and disability discrimination. He was one of three wheelchair basketball players featured in the 2002 BBC One ident Hip-Hop. He was one of the main presenters of the children's programme Xchange produced for CBBC and has appeared in the soap opera EastEnders. He starred as wheelchair basketball coach, "Baggy Awolowo", in the TV series Desperados.

In 2005, Adepitan participated in Beyond Boundaries which was a four-part documentary in which Adepitan trekked through rainforests, deserts, rivers and mountains in Nicaragua and made his own video diary filmed in London and Spain, talking about his sporting aspirations and how he coped as a London boy living in Zaragoza unable to speak any Spanish.

Adepitan has become increasingly involved in making documentaries for Channel 4; he was appointed as one of the main presenters on Channel 4 of the London 2012 Paralympic Games and co-presents That Paralympic Show with Rick Edwards. and in 2013, he presented a Channel 4 Dispatches programme, Britain on Benefits, as well as a documentary for Channel 4's Unreported World about Cuban basketball players, Cuba, Basketball and Betrayal. He was also part of the Channel 4 2014 Winter Paralympic Games and the Rio 2016 Paralympics presenting team alongside Clare Balding.

Adepitan has also worked with the BBC, having presented the Invictus Games, guest-presenting an episode of The One Show alongside Alex Jones. In 2016, Adepitan co-presented three-part BBC Two series New York: America's Busiest City alongside Anita Rani and Ant Anstead.  Since 2016, Adepitan has co-presented the BBC's Children in Need appeal. In 2017 he co-presented World's Busiest Cities with Anita Rani and Dan Snow. In 2019, Adepitan presented a new four-part series for BBC Two Africa with Ade Adepitan, traveling across Africa, from West Africa and city of his birth - Lagos in Nigeria - through Central and Eastern Africa and on to the deep south of the continent. In 2021 he was one of the BBC presenters for the Global Citizen Festival, a panelist with the BBC game show Blankety Blank  and celebrity contestant of  Catchphrase on 30 October, competing against his Paralympics co-presenter Clare Balding.

Charity works 
Adepitan does a lot of charity work, particularly supporting many charities to help other people with physical disabilities. He is a patron of Go Kids Go (formerly known as Association of Wheelchair Children). He is also a great supporter of the National Society for the Prevention of the Cruelty to Children Charity (NSPCC) and the WheelPower Charity. Adepitan travelled to Ghana in support of Comic Relief. He also participated in the Disabled Motoring UK Alps 2011 Challenge. Adepitan is also an Athlete Ambassador for Right to Play, the world's leading sport for development charity.

Awards 
Adepitan was made a Member of the Order of the British Empire (MBE) for services to disability sport in 2005. He was also presented with an Honorary Doctorate from Loughborough University, in recognition of his outstanding services to, and performances in, disability sport. The same year, Adepitan was awarded a 'Certificate of Excellence' by the Champions Club UK in recognition not only of his efforts at promoting disability sport, but also for being a positive role model. He was particularly commended for his strong and persistent message of hope within the young black disabled community.

He was presented with the Lifetime Achievement award by the University of East London in 2010, and had an Honorary Doctorate conferred by the university in November 2010.

In 2020, Adepitan was included in the Powerlist of the 100 most influential Black British people.

Personal life 
On 19 August 2018, Adepitan married Scottish singer Linda Harrison (who performs as Elle Exxe) in St Paul's Cathedral. They have a son, born 4 January 2021.

References

External links 

 Not just anybody: Ade Adepitan
 Summer 2006 Oration - Ade Adepitan
 The Presenters: Ade Adepitan
 

Living people
1973 births
English television presenters
Television presenters with disabilities
Members of the Order of the British Empire
Wheelchair basketball players at the 2004 Summer Paralympics
Paralympic Games broadcasters
Paralympic wheelchair basketball players of Great Britain
Paralympic bronze medalists for Great Britain
Wheelchair category Paralympic competitors
English people of Nigerian descent
English people of Yoruba descent
Nigerian emigrants to the United Kingdom
Medalists at the 2004 Summer Paralympics
Paralympic medalists in wheelchair basketball